Charles Tatham may refer to:
Charles Heathcote Tatham (1772–1842), British architect
Charles Tatham (fencer) (1854–1939), American Olympic fencer
Charlie Tatham (Charles Murray Tatham, 1925–2016), Canadian politician
Chuck Tatham (Charles "Chuck" Tatham, born 1963), Canadian screenwriter and television producer
Charles Tatham (tennis) (born 1925), British tennis player